Pannalal Bhattacharya (c. 1930 – 27 March 1966) was an Indian singer of Bengali music. Most of the songs he sang were written by Ramprasad Sen and Kamalakanta Bhattacharya, both of whom were Shakta poets of Bengal. He was eight years younger than his elder brother Dhananjay Bhattacharya. He developed a special style of singing, Shyama Sangeet, that continues to be used. He committed suicide at the age of 36. Pannalal Bhattacharya is the evergreen singer of Bengali music industry. Pannalal Bhattacharya is a great Matri Bhakta.

Early life
Very little is known about his background. Even the Bengali 'Cąritavidan' does not provide adequate information about his early life or  childhood.  He was born in Bally, Barendrapara, Howrah and spent most of his life there.

Career
Pannalal started singing in 1947, at the age of 17, with another renowned musician, Sanat Sinha. His elder brother Prafulla took them both to a program, where none of them were allowed to sing because of the immaturity in their voices. They encountered the same problem at HMV. They got their first break in Megaphone. At first Pannalal sang modern Bengali songs, until Bishwanath Kumar, a friend of Sanat Sinha signed him for his first hit Shyama sangeet, "Aamar sadh na mitilo aasha na purilo, sokoli phuraye jay ma..." (None of my desires were fulfilled, nor my hopes have come true, O mother...). This rendition is now acclaimed as a classic in Bengal. However, "Aamar Sadhna mitilo" wasn't Pannalal's first Shyama sangeet record. His earlier and popular songs include "Aamar Mayer Paye Jaba Hoye", "Tui naki Ma Dayamayee", Tui je Kemon Dayamayee", "Sakali Tomari Ichha", "Amay De Ma Pagal Kore", "Muchiye De Ma Aamar a Duti Nayan", "Moneri basona shyama" among others.

Pannalal developed a special style of singing, that with devotion. His distinct voice and a spirit filled with devotion have touched the hearts of countless devotees of Mother Kali across Bengal. He became a great devotee of goddess Kali and always remained engrossed in her thoughts. Pannalal and his elder brother Dhananjay  Bhattacharya, another eminent singer of Shyama Sangeet, wanted to please Kali by offering her their songs. One doesn't need to necessarily know Bengali to empathize with his unparalleled tune dripping with devotion regardless of belief. One will feel his climbing, devoted prayer to Mother Kali mounting in his own heart.

In the last years, Pannalal looked morose for some unknown reason. It is claimed by some that Dhananjay, received the divine grace of Mother Kali, the Exalted, but Pannalal didn't, and so he committed suicide on 27 March 1966, in his house on Kakulia Road. He died only at a very young age of 36, but he has claimed a paramount position in the hearts of thousands of Kali devotees since his first Shyama Sangeet performance.

Personal life
Pannalal was married and cared well for his family until his death in 1966. After his death his elder brother Dhananjay bore the responsibility of Pannalal's family, along with his own.

See also

 Dhananjay Bhattacharya

References

Pannalal Bhattacharya. hummaa.com.

External links

1930 births
1966 deaths
Bengali singers
20th-century Indian singers
Date of birth missing
Place of birth missing
Singers from West Bengal
20th-century Indian male singers
1966 suicides
Suicides in India